The Osuga is a river in Selizharovsky, Kuvshinovsky, Torzhoksky, and Spirovsky Districts of Tver Oblast of Russia, a right tributary of the Tvertsa. The town of Kuvshinovo is along the banks of the Osuga.

The source of the Osuga is in the south-eastern part of the Valdai Hills, in the east of Selizharovsky District. The Osuga flows east, making a stretch of a border between Selizharovsky and Kuvshinovsky Districts, and enters Kuvshinovsky District. In the village of Taraskovo, there is a dam, making a pond. Further downstream, the Osuga flows through town of Kuvshinovo, turns north-east and enters Torzhoksky District. The last stretch of the Osuga flows on the border between Torzhoksky and Spirovsky Districts. The mouth of the Osuga is close to the settlement of Tveretsky.

The drainage basin of the Osuga includes almost the whole Kuvshinovsky District, the northwestern part of Torzhoksky District, as well as minor areas in Spirovsky, Vyshnevolotsky, and Selizharovsky Districts.

References

Rivers of Tver Oblast